James Leroy Brenneman (February 13, 1941 – March 10, 1994) was a Major League Baseball pitcher. Brenneman played for the New York Yankees in the  baseball season. In three career games, he had a 0–0 record, with an 18.00 ERA. He batted and threw right-handed. Brenneman was the winning pitcher for the Yankees in their 1965 Hall of Fame exhibition game against the Philadelphia Phillies at Doubleday Field in Cooperstown.

External links

1941 births
1994 deaths
New York Yankees players
Major League Baseball pitchers
Baseball players from San Diego
Colorado Mesa Mavericks baseball players
Modesto Reds players
Columbus Confederate Yankees players
Augusta Yankees players
Richmond Virginians (minor league) players
Toledo Mud Hens players
Greensboro Yankees players